Gavin Hunt (born 11 July 1964) is a South African former football (soccer) player and coach who currently manages Supersport United. He previously managed Premier Soccer League club Kaizer Chiefs. On 28 May 2021 Kaizer Chiefs released him from his contract after a string of poor results with the club.

A nuggety right-back, Hunt spent almost his entire playing career with Hellenic. He had to retire because of an achilles tendon injury and went straight into coaching.

Hunt's greatest success came at SuperSport United, where he won three consecutive PSL championships from 2007-08 to 2009-10
 
He previously managed Seven Stars, Hellenic FC, Black Leopards and Moroka Swallows.

Honours
2017 Telkom Knockout Cup - Bidvest Wits
2016/17 Premier Soccer League – Bidvest Wits
2016 MTN 8 - Bidvest Wits F.C.
2012 Nedbank Cup – Supersport United
2010 Coach of the Year – Supersport United
2010 Premier Soccer League – Supersport United
2009 Coach of the Year – Supersport United
2009 Premier Soccer League – Supersport United
2008 Premier Soccer League – Supersport United
2008 Coach of the Year – Supersport United
2004 ABSA Cup – Moroka Swallows 
2002 Coach of the Year – Black Leopards
1997/98 First Division Coastal Stream – Seven Stars

References

1964 births
Living people
South African soccer managers
South African soccer players
Soccer players from Cape Town
White South African people
South African people of British descent
Association football defenders
Hellenic F.C. players
SuperSport United F.C. managers
Moroka Swallows F.C. managers
Bidvest Wits F.C. managers